Fusceulima sordida is a species of sea snail, a marine gastropod mollusk in the family Eulimidae.

Distribution

This species occurs in the following locations:

 European waters (ERMS scope)

References

External links
 To World Register of Marine Species

Eulimidae
Gastropods described in 1897